Innocent passage is a concept in the law of the sea that allows for a vessel to pass through the archipelagic and territorial waters of another state, subject to certain restrictions. The United Nations Convention on the Law of the Sea Article 19 defines innocent passage as:

Innocent passage concedes the coastal country's territorial sea claim, unlike freedom of navigation, which directly contests it.

History
Initially, the right of innocent passage in the current sense began to take shape in the 1840s (as a  customary rule) with the development of world trade and the emergence of steamships navigation, for which it was economically significant to use the shortest possible route often through the coastal waters of a foreign state.
The law was codified in the 1958 Geneva Convention and affirmed in  the 1982 UNCLOS.

See also
 1986 Black Sea incident
 1988 Black Sea bumping incident
 Corfu Channel incident
 Right of passage
 Transit passage

References

External links
 UN Convention on the Law of the Sea, Part II: Section 3 defines "innocent passage"
 Spadi, F. (2001), "The Bridge on the Strait of Messina: 'Lowering' the Right of Innocent Passage?", International and Comparative Law Quarterly, 50: 411–419.

Law of the sea